Stygobromus conradi, commonly called Burnsville Cove cave amphipod, is a troglomorphic species of amphipod in family Crangonyctidae. It is endemic to Virginia in the United States.

See also 
 Butler Cave Conservation Society

References

Freshwater crustaceans of North America
Crustaceans described in 1967
Cave crustaceans
conradi
Endemic fauna of Virginia